Lucas Toussaint (born 29 March 1996) is a French professional footballer who plays as a defensive midfielder for  club Martigues. He has represented France youth teams at levels up to and including France U20.

Club career
Toussaint spent ten his formative years with Metz, making his debut with the first team in Ligue 2 at the age of 19, in the game against Sochaux on 7 August 2015.

On 7 July 2016, Metz announced Toussaint would join their satellite Belgian side Seraing United on a season-long loan. In late September 2017, Toussaint again went out on loan, this time to Pau in the French Championnat National. At the end of his Metz contract, he signed for Quevilly-Rouen in June 2018.

On 28 June 2021, Toussaint moved to Martigues.

Honours 
Martigues

 Championnat National 2: 2021–22

References

External links

 

1996 births
Living people
Footballers from Metz
Association football defenders
French footballers
France youth international footballers
FC Metz players
R.F.C. Seraing (1922) players
Pau FC players
US Quevilly-Rouen Métropole players
FC Martigues players
Ligue 2 players
Championnat National players
Championnat National 2 players
Championnat National 3 players
French expatriate footballers
Expatriate footballers in Belgium
French expatriate sportspeople in Belgium